Nicholas D. Kiti kiti has served as the ambassador of Zimbabwe to Iran since July 27, 2007. He previously served as the Executive Secretary of the National Economic Consultative Forum and as Permanent Secretary in the Ministry of Mines and Energy.

Ambassador Kitikiti met with President Mahmoud Ahmadinejad on December 24, 2007. President Ahmadinejad praised bilateral relations and pledged unity in the face of Western criticism.

See also
Foreign relations of Iran
Foreign relations of Zimbabwe
Israel-Zimbabwe relations

References

Ambassadors of Zimbabwe to Iran
Year of birth missing (living people)
Living people